An oil can (oilcan or oiler) is a can that holds oil (usually motor oil) for lubricating machines. An oil can can also be used to fill oil-based lanterns. An occupation, referred to as an oiler, can use an oil can (among other tools) to lubricate machinery.

Oil cans were made by companies like Noera Manufacturing Company and Perfection in the late 19th and early 20th centuries. Around this time, oil cans frequently leaked and contributed to fires. In 1957, aluminium oil cans were introduced, produced by companies like the American Can Company.

Rocanville, Saskatchewan, Canada is home to a large-scale oil can industry because of the Symons Oiler factory which produced oil cans during World War II.

Design
Oil cans come in a variety of designs, from a simple cylindrical disposable can opened with a churchkey (or with a combined spout-opener), to a hemisphere base and tapered straight spout to more intricate designs with handles and push-buttons, to the modern plastic bottle. In 2000, the 3-In-One Oil can was redesigned to look like the early 20th century design (hemisphere base with tapered straight spout).

See also
 Oil-can delay method, an echo system
 Oil-canning:
 a wavy surface condition on roll-formed metal sheets
 a metalforming drawing process

References

External links

 The Sutcliffe Midget Oilcan, miniature oil cans made by Sutcliffe Pressings for toy/miniature steam engines, stationarysteamengines.co.uk, retrieved 19 July 2010

Liquid containers
Lubrication